Pitch Black is the debut studio album by the Finnish melodic death metal band Rifftera. It was released 2015 and reached position 37 in The Official Finnish Charts. The album features guest appearance from Björn "Speed" Strid of Soilwork on the track "Rotten to the Core".

Track listing 
All lyrics written by Janne Hietala.

Personnel

Rifftera 
 Janne Hietala – guitar, harsh vocals
 Mikko Kuoppamaa – guitar, clean vocals
 Antti Pöntinen – keyboards
 Jupe Karhu – bass

Guest musicians 
 Thomas Tunkkari – drums
 Björn "Speed" Strid (Soilwork) – vocals on "Rotten to the Core"

Production 
 Janne Hietala – production, engineering, mixing
 Mikko Kuoppamaa – engineering
 Sami Koivisto – engineering (drums), mastering
 Petri Lampela – cover art
 Heidi Järvi – photography

Charts

References

External links 
 Pitch Black (album) at Encyclopaedia Metallum
 Rifftera - Rotten to the Core video at YouTube
 Rifftera - Lightbringer video at YouTube

2015 debut albums
Rifftera albums